The 1987–88 Bundesliga was the 25th season of the Bundesliga, the premier football league in West Germany. It began on 31 July 1987 and ended on 21 May 1988. FC Bayern Munich were the defending champions.

Competition modus
Every team played two games against each other team, one at home and one away. Teams received two points for a win and one point for a draw. If two or more teams were tied on points, places were determined by goal difference and, if still tied, by goals scored. The team with the most points were crowned champions while the two teams with the fewest points were relegated to 2. Bundesliga. The third-to-last team had to compete in a two-legged relegation/promotion play-off against the third-placed team from 2. Bundesliga.

Team changes to 1986–87
Fortuna Düsseldorf and SpVgg Blau-Weiß 1890 Berlin were directly relegated to the 2. Bundesliga after finishing in the last two places. They were replaced by Hannover 96 and Karlsruher SC. Relegation/promotion play-off participant FC Homburg won on aggregate against FC St. Pauli and thus retained their Bundesliga status.

Team overview

 Waldhof Mannheim played their matches in nearby Ludwigshafen because their own ground did not fulfil Bundesliga requirements.

League table

Results

Relegation play-offs
SV Waldhof Mannheim and third-placed 2. Bundesliga team SV Darmstadt 98 had to compete in a two-legged relegation/promotion play-off. After a two-leg series, both teams were tied 4–4 on aggregate, so a deciding third match had to be scheduled. Mannheim won this match in a penalty shootout and retained their Bundesliga status.

Top goalscorers
19 goals
  Jürgen Klinsmann (VfB Stuttgart)

18 goals
  Karl-Heinz Riedle (SV Werder Bremen)

17 goals
  Lothar Matthäus (FC Bayern Munich)
  Siegfried Reich (Hannover 96)

16 goals
  Harald Kohr (1. FC Kaiserslautern)
  Fritz Walter (VfB Stuttgart)

15 goals
  Dieter Eckstein (1. FC Nürnberg)
  Frank Ordenewitz (SV Werder Bremen)

14 goals
  Olaf Thon (FC Schalke 04)

13 goals
  Stefan Kuntz (Bayer 05 Uerdingen)
  Uwe Leifeld (VfL Bochum)
  Flemming Povlsen (1. FC Köln)
  Jürgen Wegmann (FC Bayern Munich)
  Michael Zorc (Borussia Dortmund)

Champion squad

References

External links
 DFB Bundesliga archive 1987/1988

Bundesliga seasons
1
Germany